Doudou Ndiaye Rose (born Mamadou Ndiaye; 28 July 1930 – 19 August 2015) was a Senegalese drummer, composer and band leader, and was the recognized modern master of Senegal's traditional drum, the sabar. He was the father of a musical dynasty that includes some of the most successful traditional musicians of contemporary West Africa. He was one of the first musicians to bring Senegalese traditional music to the attention of the world.

Career
Rose was one of the most renowned African musicians of the 20th century.  While he specialized in the sabar, he also played many other types of drum such as saourouba, assicot, bougarabou, meung meung, lambe, n'der, gorom babass, and khine. The child of a Griot (West African bard caste) family, Ndiaye Rose began performing in the 1930s, but continued to make his living as a plumber for some time.  Shortly before Senegalese independence he performed with Josephine Baker, and became a favorite with Dakar audiences. In 1960 he made the first head of the Senegalese National Ballet, and in the 1970s with his Doudou Ndiaye Rose Orchestra. He also collaborated with Miles Davis and the Rolling Stones.

In 2006, he was declared a "living human treasure" by the UN cultural agency for keeping alive traditional rhythms.

His final concerts were recently, with a festival in celebration of his 85th birthday, Deggi Daaj International, with whom he collaborated intimately since 2012, which is dedicated to the evolution & transmission of Doudou Ndiaye Rose's rhythm science, beyond the borders of Senegal, the African continent, and his lifetime.

Family of drummers
Born in Dakar, Senegal, into a family of Wolof royals, he was the founder and chief drum major of the Drummers of West Africa (all members of his family), with which he also performed. He also led an all-female drum group called Les Rosettes, composed entirely of his own daughters and granddaughters.

Styles
Ndiaye Rose was purported to have developed 500 new rhythms, and, indeed, his music is quite complex, featuring ever-changing rhythmic structures which he conducted with his trademark vigorous style. He also invented new types of drum.

Recorded work
Perhaps his most well-known album, Djabote (Real World CDRW43), features 12 tracks recorded on the Isle of Gorée in March 1991. It was recorded in one week with his group of 50 drummers and the Julien Jouga's Choir, an 80-member, all-female choir.
Ndiaye Rose performed with Dizzy Gillespie, Alan Stivell ("Again"), Miles Davis, the Rolling Stones, Peter Gabriel, Kodo and Bill Bruford.
He is also featured in the remix of "The Warning" by Nine Inch Nails, which was on their album Year Zero Remixed.

Films
Djabote:  Senegalese Drumming & Song From Master Drummer Doudou Ndiaye Rose (1993). Directed by Béatrice Soulé and Eric Millot. Montpelier, Vermont: Multicultural Media.

References

External links
"Doudou Ndiaye Rose:  The Griot, the Drum Master", from The Oral Tradition site.
Doudou Ndiaye Rose, grand percussionniste, Africa Nouvelles. 2008.
Doudou NDiaye Rose The master of Senegalese percussion, Radio France International, 18 April 2005.
"50 ans de présence sur scène: Doudou Ndiaye Rose, prophète chez lui". Le Quotidien, 28 April 2008.

1930 births
2015 deaths
Senegalese drummers
People from Dakar
Real World Records artists
Sabar players